

Countess of Limburg

House of Ardennes, 1065–1119

House of Ardennes, 1119–1283 

Interregnum (1283–1288)

House of Leuven, 1288–1406

House of Valois, 1406–1482

House of Habsburg, 1482–1700

House of Bourbon, 1700–1706

House of Habsburg, 1706–1780

House of Habsburg-Lorraine, 1780–1794

House of Orange-Nassau, 1839–1866

See also 
Duchess of Brabant
List of Lotharingian consorts
List of Burgundian consorts
List of consorts of Luxembourg
Countess of Flanders
Countess of Holland
List of Dutch consorts

Limburg
Limburg
Duchy of Limburg
 
Titles